Maindy Barracks is a military installation in the Cathays district of Cardiff in Wales.

History
Maindy Barracks opened in 1877. Their creation took place as part of the Cardwell Reforms which encouraged the localisation of British military forces. The barracks became the depot for the 41st (Welch) Regiment of Foot and the 69th (South Lincolnshire) Regiment of Foot. Following the Childers Reforms, the 41st and 69th regiments amalgamated to form the Welch Regiment with its depot in the barracks in 1881.

It was home to the United States Army during the First World War; the Welch Regiment War Memorial unveiled there in 1924 was designed by Sir Edwin Lutyens. The barracks were again used by the United States Army during Second World War. In the latter war it was bombed by German aircraft.

The barracks became occupied by the newly formed Royal Regiment of Wales from 1969 and by its successor regiment, the Royal Welsh, from 2006.

Based units
The barracks are currently home to the following:

British Army

 Home Headquarters, Queen's Dragoon Guards
 Regimental Headquarters, Royal Welsh
 3rd Battalion, Royal Welsh (Army Reserve)
 Battalion Headquarters
 Headquarters Company
 157th (Welsh) Regiment, Royal Logistic Corps
 Regimental Headquarters
 249 Headquarters Squadron
 580 Transport Squadron
 Wales University Officers' Training Corps
 Headquarters
 Cardiff Detachment

Community Cadet Forces

 A Company, Welsh Army Cadets
 Gabalfa Detachment
 1344 (Cardiff) Squadron, No.1 Welsh Wing Air Training Corps

References

Sources
 

Installations of the British Army
Barracks in Wales
1877 in military history